Manfred Mühr (born 31 May 1967) is an Austrian ice hockey player. He competed in the men's tournaments at the 1988 Winter Olympics and the 1994 Winter Olympics.

References

1967 births
Living people
Austrian ice hockey players
Olympic ice hockey players of Austria
Ice hockey players at the 1988 Winter Olympics
Ice hockey players at the 1994 Winter Olympics
Ice hockey people from Vienna
EC KAC players